The Conwy Suspension Bridge is a Grade I-listed structure and is one of the first road suspension bridges in the world. Located in the medieval town of Conwy in Conwy county borough, North Wales, it is now only passable on foot. The bridge is now in the care of the National Trust. It originally carried the A55(T) road from Chester to Bangor.

History
Built by Thomas Telford, the  suspension bridge spans the River Conwy next to Conwy Castle, a World Heritage Site. The bridge was built in 1822–1826 at a cost of £51,000 and replaced the ferry at the same point. It is in the same style as one of Telford's other bridges, the Menai Suspension Bridge crossing the Menai Strait. The original wooden deck was replaced by an iron roadway in the late nineteenth century and it was strengthened by adding wire cables above the original iron chains in 1903. The following year a  walkway was added for pedestrian traffic. The bridge was superseded by a new road bridge built alongside and closed on 13 December 1958 when Henry Brooke, the Minister of Welsh Affairs, performed the opening ceremony of the new bridge. The suspension bridge is now only used as a footbridge and has been owned by the National Trust since 1965 who make a small charge for entry.

Description
Telford designed the bridge to match the adjacent Conwy Castle. The bridge deck is suspended by four tiers of two chains each (a fifth tier was added later) carried over castellated towers that have a central archway over the road with machicolation. The chains are anchored on the east side of the river by a freestone and concrete plinth while those on the western side are anchored to the eastern barbican of the castle and bedrock. Part of the castle had to be demolished during construction to anchor the suspension cables.

See also
 Conwy Railway Bridge
 List of bridges in Wales

Notes

External links

 Conwy Suspension Bridge information at the National Trust

Bridges completed in 1826
Bridges in Conwy County Borough
Buildings and structures in Conwy
Historic Civil Engineering Landmarks
Suspension bridges in Wales
Bridges by Thomas Telford
National Trust properties in Wales
Tourist attractions in Conwy County Borough
Grade I listed bridges in Wales
Grade I listed buildings in Conwy County Borough
1826 establishments in Wales